Fereydunshahr County is in Isfahan province, Iran. The capital of the county is the city of Fereydunshahr. At the 2006 census, the county's population was 38,955 in 9,259 households. The following census in 2011 counted 38,334 people in 10,657 households. At the 2016 census, the county's population was 35,654 in 10,688 households.

The majority of the county's population are Iranian Georgians. In addition, there are Turks from the Ustajlu tribe and Bakhtiaris present in the county.

Administrative divisions

The population history of Fereydunshahr County's administrative divisions over three consecutive censuses is shown in the following table. The latest census shows one district, five rural districts, and two cities.

References

 

Counties of Isfahan Province